Midway School may refer to:

Midway School (Iuka, Mississippi), a Mississippi Landmark
Midway School (Midway, Utah), formerly listed on the National Register of Historic Places in Wasatch County, Utah
Midway School (Gig Harbor, Washington), listed on the National Register of Historic Places in Pierce County, Washington